The 2022 Men's U20 Volleyball European Championship is the 28th edition of the Men's Junior European Volleyball Championship, organised by Europe's governing volleyball body, the CEV. The tournament is currently held in Montesilvano and Vasto, Italy from 17 to 25 September 2022. The top two teams of the tournament qualified for the 2023 FIVB Volleyball Men's U21 World Championship as the CEV representatives.

Players must be born on or after 1 January 2003.

Qualification
Besides the host nation team, to become one of the Top 11 teams, the sides had to participate in various cycles of qualifications. First, teams competed in 1st Round Qualifiers. The first placed teams from each then proceeded to 2nd Round, where the first placed teams from each pool booked directly their ticket to the Final Round, while the eight best placed teams (not qualified to the Final Round) from the 2nd Round, qualified to the 3rd Round. In the 3rd Round, in each pool, the first placed team qualified to the Final Round, along with the best second placed team.

Hosts

Eleven qualified teams after 3 rounds of qualifiers

Pools composition
Pools are divided after the last round of qualifier.

Format
The two best teams from each pool will play at the semifinals 1-4, while the third and the fourth from each group qualify for semifinals 5-8. The winners from semifinals 1-4 proceed ahead to the Gold Medal Match, and the losers enter the battle for the Bronze.

Squads

Venues

Pool standing procedure
 Number of matches won
 Match points
 Sets ratio
 Points ratio
 If the tie continues as per the point ratio between two teams, the priority will be given to the team which won the match between them. When the tie in points ratio is between three or more teams, a new classification of these teams in the terms of points 1, 2, 3 and 4 will be made taking into consideration only the matches in which they were opposed to each other.

Match won 3–0 or 3–1: 3 match points for the winner, 0 match points for the loser
Match won 3–2: 2 match points for the winner, 1 match point for the loser

Preliminary round
All times are Central European Summer Time (UTC+02:00).

Pool I

|}

|}

Pool II

|}

|}

Final round
All times are Central European Summer Time (UTC+02:00).

5th–8th places

5th–8th semifinals
|}

7th place match
|}

5th place match
|}

Final four

Semifinals
|}

3rd place match
|}

Final
|}

Final standing

Awards

Most Valuable Player
 Alessandro Bovolenta
Best Setter
 Kajetan Kubicki
Best Outside Spikers
 Luca Porro Aleksandar Nikolov

Best Middle Blockers
 Jakub Majchrzak Nicolò Volpe
Best Opposite Spiker
 Tytus Nowik
Best Libero
 Gabriele Laurenzano

Broadcasting & Ticketing
Live streaming of matches are on Official YouTube Channel of Italian Volleyball Federation. EuroVolley TV will broadcast from semifinals on. Also, the organizer launched a platfom for ticketing.

See also
2022 Women's U19 Volleyball European Championship

References

External links
Official website

Men's Junior European Volleyball Championship
2022 in volleyball
European U20 Championship
International men's volleyball competitions hosted by Italy
2022 in Italian sport
Volleyball European Championship